The Void is a 2001 American direct-to-DVD science fiction thriller film directed by Gilbert M. Shilton and starring Amanda Tapping, Adrian Paul, and Malcolm McDowell. Principal photography was completed in British Columbia, Canada.

Synopsis
Dr. Thomas Abernathy, the owner of Filadyne company, is leading the experiment in the particle accelerator in Luxembourg to create a small black hole which would be used as the powerful energy source. Although another scientist Dr. Soderstrom, who is present at the test site, tries to stop the experiment due to the possible danger, the experiment is started and the black hole created. However, the experiment goes awry and the black hole destroys the accelerator and claims the life of Dr. Soderstrom, as well as the lives of other personnel present in the control room.

Eight years later, his daughter Dr. Eva Soderstrom discovers that Dr. Abernathy has built a new accelerator and so she wants to prove he was responsible for the death of her father. She approaches professor Steven Price who works for Filadyne who could provide her with the data about the company activities. After she learns that Dr. Abernathy plans a new experiment, whose consequences are underestimated because of erroneous calculation, she is determined to stop him. Despite her best efforts, the experiment is started and again goes out of control and the black hole threatens to either suck in the whole planet or cause very devastating explosion. The majority of personnel escapes thanks to the actions of Dr. Sondestrom while Dr. Abernathy is sucked into the black hole. The AEC prepares the report and classifies all information about the experiment.

Cast
Amanda Tapping as Professor Eva Soderstrom
Adrian Paul as Professor Steven Price
Malcolm McDowell as Dr. Thomas Abernathy
Andrew McIlroy as Oscar
Kirsten Robek as Christine Marshall
Michael Rivkin as Dr. Jason Lazarus

External links
 

2001 films
American science fiction thriller films
2000s science fiction thriller films
2000s English-language films
2000s American films